Peter Jeffrey (18 April 1929 – 25 December 1999) was an English character actor. Starting his performing career on stage, he would later have many roles in television and film.

Early life 
Jeffrey was born in Bristol, the son of Florence Alice (née Weight) and Arthur Winfred Gilbert Jeffrey. He was educated at Harrow School and Pembroke College, Cambridge, but had no formal training as an actor.

Career

Theatre
Jeffrey spent many years on stage with the Bristol Old Vic and the Royal Shakespeare Company. From 25 May 1966 he appeared in Tango, a play by Sławomir Mrożek at the Aldwych Theatre alongside Patience Collier, Mike Pratt, Ursula Mohan and Dudley Sutton, under director Trevor Nunn.

Television
Numerous television roles include two guest appearances in Doctor Who: as the Colony Pilot in The Macra Terror (1967) and as Count Grendel in The Androids of Tara (1978). In Granada Television's daytime legal drama series Crown Court, Jeffrey played Barrister Peter Edgar QC having made a previous appearance as William Askwith Vennings in the case involving Regina v Vennings & Vennings.

He played King Philip II of Spain in the BBC serial Elizabeth R (1971) and Oliver Cromwell in By the Sword Divided (1985). He also appeared in Special Branch (1973), Thriller (1974), Porridge (1975), Some Mothers Do 'Ave 'Em (1975), Quiller (1975), Rising Damp (1978), Minder (1980), Nanny (1981), Juliet Bravo (1982), Yes Minister (1984), and Dennis Potter's Lipstick on Your Collar (1993). He played the villainous Sultan in the fantasy epic The Adventures of Baron Munchausen (1988) and appeared as Police Commissioner Blamire in Our Friends in the North (1996).

He made three appearances in The Avengers; the episodes were "Room Without A View" (1966), "The Joker" (1967) and "The Game" (1968). He featured in The New Avengers episode "House of Cards" (1976)

Movies
He played the role of Headmaster in If...., the memorable 1968 film by Lindsay Anderson. In 1971, he played Inspector Trout in The Abominable Dr. Phibes, a role he would reprise in 1972, in Dr. Phibes Rises Again.

Death 
Jeffrey died on 25 December 1999 from prostate cancer.

Filmography 

 Never Look Back (1952) – Court reporter (uncredited)
 Becket (1964) – Baron
 The Early Bird (1965) – Fire Chief
 That Riviera Touch (1966) – Mauron
 A Choice of Kings (1966) – Bishop Odo
 The Fighting Prince of Donegal (1966) – Sergeant
 The Fixer (1968) – Berezhinsky
 If.... (1968) – Headmaster: Staff
 Ring of Bright Water (1969) – Colin Wilcox
 The Best House in London (1969) – Sherlock Holmes (uncredited)
 Anne of the Thousand Days (1969) – Thomas Howard, 3rd Duke of Norfolk
 Goodbye Gemini (1970) – Detective Inspector Kingsley
 The Main Chance – "First you Eat, Later we Ruin you" (1970) – Kenneth Manmer 
 Countess Dracula (1971) – Captain Balogh – Chief Bailiff
 The Abominable Dr. Phibes (1971) – Inspector Trout
 The Horsemen (1971) – Hayatal
 Kidnapped (1973) – Riach
 What Became of Jack and Jill? (1972) – Dr. Graham
 Dr. Phibes Rises Again (1972) – Inspecter Trout
 O Lucky Man! (1973) – Factory chairman / Prison Governor
 The Odessa File (1974) – David Porath
 Deadly Strangers (1975) – Belle's Uncle
 The Return of the Pink Panther (1975) – General Wadafi
 Midnight Express (1978) – Ahmet
 Doctor Who The Androids of Tara Count Grendel (1978)
 The Quiz Kid (1979) – Rigby
 Britannia Hospital (1982) – Sir Geoffrey
 Yes Minister - episode "Party Games" (1984) - Eric Jeffries
 The Adventures of Baron Munchausen (1988) – Sultan
 Hands of a Murderer (1990) – Mycroft Holmes
 A Village Affair (1995) - Peter Morris
 The Prince and the Pauper (1996) - The Duke of Norfolk
 The Tale of Sweeney Todd (1997) - Dr. Maxwell

References

External links 
 
 Obituary in The Independent

1929 births
1999 deaths
20th-century English male actors
Alumni of Pembroke College, Cambridge
Deaths from prostate cancer
English male film actors
English male Shakespearean actors
English male stage actors
English male television actors
People educated at Harrow School
Male actors from Bristol